Knut Andersson may refer to:

 Knut Andersson (Malmö FF footballer 1939–1940), Swedish footballer
 Knut Andersson (Malmö FF footballer 1940–1943), Swedish footballer